Erle Bjoland Harstad (born 6 August 1990) is a Norwegian figure skater. She is the 2008, 2009 and 2010 Norwegian national champion. She has participated three times at the European Figure Skating Championships.

Personal life

Erle Bjoland Harstad was born in Bærum, Norway. She has two older sisters, five and six years older than her, who were both skating.

Career

Harstad began skating at the age of six. She was eleven when she landed her first triple jump, a triple toe loop. She was coached by Berit Steigedal in Asker, Norway, during the high season. She trained in Oberstdorf, Germany, and Tønsberg, Norway during the low season. 

Harstad represented Norway three times at the European Figure Skating Championships. She placed 31st 2008, and 29th in both 2009 and 2010. She has competed at the Junior Grand Prix series five seasons, her best placement being 10th place in Bulgaria in 2008.

Programs

Competitive highlights

References

External links

Navigation

1990 births
Living people
Norwegian female single skaters
People from Asker
Sportspeople from Bærum
21st-century Norwegian women